Jangneung is a burial ground from the Joseon dynasty, where King Injo and his first wife, Queen Inyeol, were entombed. Located in Paju, Gyeonggi Province, it is recognized as an UNESCO World Heritage Site.

History
It was originally built in 1635 in Uncheon-ri, Paju, but due to a fire, scorpions and snakes found refuge in the sculptures surrounding the tomb and thus the relocation became necessary. In 1731 it was moved to Galhyeon-ri. As characteristic of 17th century Korean art, the tomb is decorated with peony and lotus design.

References

Royal Tombs of the Joseon Dynasty
Paju